The Jan Kjellström International Orienteering Festival or "JK" is the premier domestic orienteering competition in the United Kingdom along with the British Orienteering Championships, usually held over the Easter Weekend.

1967 saw the first JK event, held in memory of Jan Kjellström. The annual JK moved to Easter in 1969, and now regularly attracts a field of four thousand or more. The 1974 JK was the first British race to attract more than one thousand entrants.
The JK Trophy is awarded to the winning team in the Men's Premier relay class.

Races

Race footnotes
JK69. The race was held in NEOA but organised by NWOA.
JK69. The Relay was to have been held at Slaley but had to be cancelled due to snow. The race was moved to Kielder Forest, Lewisburn Area.
JK74. This race was the first British race to attract more than one thousand competitors.
JK81. For this year only, the Relay was held on the Sunday i.e. between the two individual days.
JK89. At this race there were two deaths. On the Saturday Swedish visitor Stig Gorman (58) of Mariestad died within sight of the finishing line; and on the Sunday Martin Cochrane (81) of Sarum Orienteers died shortly after starting the Orange colour-coded course.
JK98. On the Sunday the courses using the Red start were cancelled due to snow. This decision led to a controversy which was discussed in Compass Sport & The Orienteer and also at British Orienteering Federation (BOF) National Office.
JK2001. The whole weekend of races was cancelled due to an outbreak of foot and mouth disease.
JK2006. A sprint race was introduced at this competition on the Friday, in addition to the usual Training opportunity. This was an attempt to make the sport more 'spectator friendly' and was part of the International Orienteering Federation's proposal to make the sport an Olympic sport.
JK2020 & 2021. The whole weekend of races was cancelled due to an outbreak of COVID-19. Races were to be held by NEOA for 2020 & SWOA for 2021 before cancellation. See COVID-19 pandemic in the United Kingdom for more details.

Champions

References

External links
The Official JK Site for 2008
The Official JK Site for 2009
The Official JK Site for 2010
The Official JK Site for 2011
The Official JK Site for 2012
The Official JK Site for 2013
The Official JK Site for 2014
The Official JK Site for 2015
The Official JK Site for 2016
British Orienteering Historical Championship Results

Orienteering in the United Kingdom
Orienteering competitions